The National Association of Credential Evaluation Services (NACES) is a United States non-profit organization, established in 1987, which accredits private companies who, in turn, provide transcript evaluation services of academic degrees awarded from non-United States educational institutions.

The United States Department of Education does not evaluate foreign academic records for equivalency to degrees issued in the U.S., this responsibility instead falling to individual institutions of higher education. While some institutions undertake such evaluations themselves, others instead refer students to one of 19 private companies which are accredited by NACES. Universities which accept evaluations conducted by NACES accredited firms include the University of Michigan, University of Washington, University of Nevada Las Vegas, and others. The National Institutes of Health requires prospective job applicants with non-United States degrees to have their credentials evaluated by a NACES accredited firm.

According to U.S. News & World Report, "NACES members commit to an enforced code of ethics and undergo an in-depth prescreening and yearly recertification". NACES reports its standards for accreditation of evaluation agencies require that they employ evaluation specialists who have five or more years full-time experience in international admissions at a regionally accredited American university, accept periodic on-site inspection from NACES, adhere to a code of ethics, and maintain "extensive reference, resource libraries, and other databases".

References

External links
 Official website

1987 establishments in the United States